Dolovi is a village in the municipality of Velika Kladuša, Bosnia and Herzegovina.

Demographics 
According to the 2013 census, its population was 887.

References

Populated places in Velika Kladuša